Lioptilodes yungas is a species of moth in the genus Lioptilodes known from Bolivia. Moths of this species take flight in May and have a wingspan of approximately 24 millimetres. The species name "yungas" is derived from the region Yungas, whence the species was collected for examination.

References

Platyptiliini
Moths of South America
Fauna of the Andes
Yungas
Moths described in 2006
Taxa named by Cees Gielis